Ahmad Azam bin Hamzah (born 1961) is a Malaysian politician who is one of the members of the Dewan Negara, 14th Malaysian Parliament from Negeri Sembilan since 15 August 2022. He is honoured with the Negeri Sembilan Loyalty Degree. He is associated with the People's Justice Party.

References 

1961 births
Members of the Dewan Negara
Living people